Kim Sung-Jun (Hangul: 김성준, Hanja: 金性俊) (June 3, 1953 – February 3, 1989) was a boxer from South Korea.

In January, 1978, he won the Orient and Pacific Boxing Federation light flyweight title.

In September, 1978, Kim became the WBC light flyweight champion with a KO win over Netrnoi Sor Vorasingh. He defended the belt three times before losing it to Shigeo Nakajima in January, 1980.

In July, 1980, Kim unsuccessfully challenged Shoji Oguma for the WBC flyweight title, losing by a split decision.

After retiring, Kim experienced dementia pugilistica and financial difficulties, and on February 3, 1989, he committed suicide by leaping off a building in Seoul, South Korea.

External links
 

1953 births
1989 suicides
World light-flyweight boxing champions
World boxing champions
World Boxing Council champions
South Korean male boxers
Suicides by jumping in South Korea
Sportspeople with chronic traumatic encephalopathy
Sportspeople from Busan